This is a list of yard and district craft of the United States Navy. It covers the various types of craft and ships that support the bases and harbors of the United States Navy. The hull classification symbols for these craft begin with (Y).

Ship status is indicated as either currently active [A] (including ready reserve), inactive [I], or precommissioning [P]. Ships in the inactive category include only ships in the inactive reserve, ships which have been disposed from US service have no listed status. Ships in the precommissioning category include ships under construction or on order.

Historical overview
This list demonstrates that the US Navy constantly recycles and repurposes its small craft for new roles. Some craft on this list have had as many as six such conversions in their history. Some of these conversions have been surprising from an environmental viewpoint, such as the conversion of fuel oil barges into water barges. Some conversions have been surprising from an economic viewpoint, such as the simultaneous conversions of open barges to covered barges during the conversions of covered barges to open barges, which can be justified only by relatively high transportation costs.

The District Auxiliary, Miscellaneous (YAG) designation has been used as a cover for at least two ships employed in classified tests of biological, chemical, and nuclear weapons (aka WMD).

Some of these vessels have held prior or later classifications as unclassified miscellaneous (IX), or more rarely as auxiliaries miscellaneous (AG, T-AG).

Ash Barges (YA) 
 YA-18, ex-YO-37, ex-YE-14, later YCF-5, YFN-570
 YA-43, later YF-56
 YA-44, later YF-54
 YA-52, lost due to enemy action in the Philippines
 YA-59, lost due to enemy action in the Philippines
 YA-65, lost due to enemy action in the Philippines

District Auxiliary, Miscellaneous (YAG) 
For similar lists of 'miscellaneous' ships see 
 
and
List of unclassified miscellaneous vessels of the United States Navy (IX) 
 Tatoosh (YAG-1)
 YAG-2, lost due to enemy action in the Philippines
 YAG-3, lost due to enemy action in the Philippines
 YAG-4, sunk by Japanese gunfire in South Harbor, Corregidor, 12 April 1942
 YAG-5
 YAG-6
 YAG-7, patrol vessel
 YAG-8, later AG-47, weather ship
 YAG-9, later AG-48, weather ship, sunk 9 September 1942 by U-755
 YAG-10, acquisition canceled
 Baranof (YAG-11), cargo ship for Alaskan bases
 YAG-12, liberty ferry and barracks ship
 YAG-13, ex-Palace (PYc-33)
 YAG-14, ex-Tourist (PYc-32)
 Mindoro (YAG-15)
 YAG-16, cargo ship for Bahamian and Cuban bases
 YAG-17, moored attack transport simulator, wrecked in the 1944 Great Atlantic hurricane 14 September 1944
 YAG-18, refrigerator cargo ship for Caribbean bases
 YAG-19, cargo ship for Caribbean bases
 YAG-20, ex-YHB-15, cargo ship for Caribbean bases
 YAG-21, ex-YHB-17, cargo ship for Caribbean bases, grounded near Key West 2 March 1945
 YAG-22, later YF-568
 Ensenada (YAG-23), refrigerator cargo ship
 Awahou (YAG-24)
 Port Whangarei (YAG-25)
 Taupata (YAG-26)
 Kohi (YAG-27), sailing scow
 YAG-28, cargo ship for Caribbean bases
 YAG-29, ex-CG-4
 YAG-30
 YAG-31
 Christiana (YAG-32), seaplane tender, ex-IX-80
 YAG-33, ex-USAS FS-80
 YAG-34, torpedo range tender
 Nashawena (YAG-35), ex-AG-142, cable repair craft
 Floyd W. Spencer (YAG-36), experimental minesweeper 
 John L. Sullivan (YAG-37), experimental minesweeper 
 Edward Kavanagh (YAG-38), experimental minesweeper 
 George Eastman (YAG-39), WMD test ship
 Granville S. Hall (YAG-40), WMD test ship
 YAG-41 through YAG-44, not used, intended for first 4 Guardian-class AGR radar picket ships
 YAG-45 through YAG-55, not used, planned ship acquisitions canceled
 YAG-56, not used, intended for USS Compass Island (E-AG-153)
 YAG-57, not used, intended for USS Observation Island (E-AG-154)
 YAG-58, not used, intended for USS Francis Marion (APA-249)
 Michael Moran (YAG-59)
 Butternut (YAG-60), ex-AN-9, ANL-9, missile range ship
 Monob One (YAG-61), ex-IX-309
 Deer Island (YAG-62)
 Saluda (YAG-87), sailing yawl, sound test ship, ex-IX-87

Radar Picket Ships (YAGR)

Guardian-class radar picket ship

All Guardian-class ships were reclassed as AGR in 1958; they were originally intended to be classed as District Auxiliaries, Miscellaneous (YAG) - see YAG-41 through YAG-44 - but this was not done.

 USS Guardian (YAGR-1)
 USS Lookout (YAGR-2)
 USS Skywatcher (YAGR-3)
 USS Searcher (YAGR-4)
 USS Scanner (YAGR-5)
 USS Locator (YAGR-6)
 USS Picket (YAGR-7)
 USS Interceptor (YAGR-8)
 USS Investigator (YAGR-9)
 USS Outpost (YAGR-10)
 USS Protector (YAGR-11)
 USS Vigil (YAGR-12)
 USS Interdictor (YAGR-13)
 USS Interpreter (YAGR-14)
 USS Interrupter (YAGR-15)
 USS Watchman (YAGR-16)

Open Barges (YC, YCK) 

 YC-119, later YFN-48
 YC-164, later YR-5
 YC-174, later YFN-86, lost Philippines 1942
 YC-179, later YFN-162
 YC-181, lost due to enemy action in the Philippines 1942
 YC-203, later YFN-211 
 YC-210, later YF-53
 YC-263, later YFN-674, YHB-36
 YC-239, later YFN-198 
 YC-246, later YFN-200
 YC-261, later YFN-250
 YC-264, later YFN-251
 YC-271, ex-YE-39, later YFN-243
 YC-273, later YFN-244
 YC-274, later YR-20
 YC-275, later YFN-208 
 YC-276, later YFN-209
 YC-278, later YFN-248
 YC-280, ex-YFN-239, later YRB-14
 YC-282, ex-YE-38, later YFN-242
 YC-284, later YFN-254
 YC-285, later YFN-246
 YC-291, later YFN-225 
 YC-292, ex-YE-34, later YFN-238
 YC-294, later YR-21
 YC-295, later YFN-253
 YC-296, later YR-22
 YC-303, later YFN-187
 YC-305, later YFN-255
 YC-311, later YFN-247
 YC-315, later YFN-249
 YC-321, later YFN-217 
 YC-326, later YFN-70 
 YC-327, later YFN-71 
 YC-328, later YFN-90 
 YC-329, later YFN-91 
 YC-331, later YFN-74 
 YC-332, later YFN-75 
 YC-333, later YFN-76 
 YC-351, later YFN-83 
 YC-352, later YFN-84, destroyed 1943
 YC-353, later YFN-85 
 YC-363, later YFN-88
 YC-364, later YFN-89 
 YC-383, later YFN-199 
 YC-412, later YFN-111
 YC-415, later YCD-1, YOS-1
 YC-442 - sank 11 September 1923
 YC-446, later YFN-87 
 YC-455, later YR-8
 YC-456, later YR-9
 YC-462, later YFN-245
 YC-463, ex-YPK-4, later YF-672
 YC-467, later YFN-218 
 YC-468, ex-YE-36, later YFN-240
 YC-469, ex-YE-37, later YFN-241
 YC-480, later YFN-186 
 YC-484, ex-YE-32, later YFN-236
 YC-485, ex-YE-33, later YFN-237
 YC-488, later YFN-226
 YC-504, later YFN-220
 YC-523, lost off Portsmouth New Hampshire 24 February 1944
 YC-537, lost due to enemy action in the Philippines 1942
 YC-623, later YFN-256
 YC-643, lost due to enemy action in the Philippines 1942
 YC-644, lost due to enemy action in the Philippines 1942
 YC-646, lost due to enemy action in the Philippines 1942
 YC-647, lost due to enemy action in the Philippines 1942
 YC-648, lost due to enemy action in the Philippines 1942
 YC-649, lost due to enemy action in the Philippines 1942
 YC-650, later YFN-540
 YC-652, lost due to enemy action in the Philippines 1942
 YC-653, lost due to enemy action in the Philippines 1942
 YC-654, lost due to enemy action in the Philippines 1942
 YC-664, lost due to enemy action at Guam December 1941
 YC-665, lost due to enemy action at Guam December 1941
 YC-666, lost due to enemy action at Guam December 1941
 YC-667, lost due to enemy action at Guam December 1941
 YC-668, lost due to enemy action at Guam December 1941
 YC-669, lost due to enemy action in the Philippines 1942
 YC-670, lost due to enemy action at Guam December 1941
 YC-671, lost due to enemy action at Guam December 1941
 YC-672, lost due to enemy action at Guam December 1941
 YC-673, lost due to enemy action at Guam December 1941
 YC-674, lost due to enemy action at Guam December 1941
 YC-683, lost due to enemy action in the Philippines 1942
 YC-685, lost due to enemy action at Guam December 1941
 YC-693, lost off Alaska February 1945
 YC-701, later YR-23
 YC-792, later YFN-1151
 YC-714 lost due to enemy action in the Philippines 1942
 YC-715 lost due to enemy action in the Philippines 1942
 YC-716 lost due to enemy action in the Philippines 1942
 YC-717 lost due to enemy action at Guam December 1941
 YC-718 lost due to enemy action at Guam December 1941
 YC-805, later YFN-1153
 YC-813, ex-YF-334
 YC-857, lost off Cape Cod Massachusetts 12 November 1943
 YC-860, later YFN-676	
 YC-861, later YFN-677	
 YC-862, ex-YFN-678, later YRB-10
 YC-869, lost off Imperial Beach California 23 March 1943
 YC-886, lost at Guantanamo Cuba 3 February 1943
 YC-887, lost at Guantanamo Cuba 3 February 1943
 YC-891 - sank on 18 April 1945, while under tow by the tug Mauvila (YT-328) off Key West, Florida
 YC-898, lost off Key West Florida 29 September 1942
 YC-899, lost off Key West Florida 29 September 1942
 YC-908, later YFN-1149
 YC-912, lost in the North Pacific 13 January 1945
 YC-961, lost at Biorka Island May 1945
 YC-970, lost in Puget Sound Washington 14 August 1943
 YC-1037, ex-YFN-396
 YC-1079, later YRB-22, later YR-92
 YC-1212, ex-YFN-1008
 YC-1213, ex-YFN-1009
 YC-1219, ex-YF-586
 YC-1220, ex-YF-587, later YRB-13
 YC-1272, lost near San Pedro California June 1945
 YC-1278, lost off the Atlantic coast 10 March 1943
 YC-1291, later YF-1094
 YC-1292, later YF-1095
 YC-1293, later YF-1096
 YC-1294, later YF-1097
 YC-1295, later YF-1098
 YC-1343, ex-YFN-938
 YC-1349, ex-YFN-285
 YC-1353, ex-YFN-637
 YC-1355, ex-YFN-508
 YC-1354, ex-YFN-699
 YC-1356, ex-YFN-904
 YC-1378, later YFN-1288
 YC-1461, ex-YFN-1226
 YC-1462, ex-YFN-1227
 YC-1463, ex-YFN-1228
 YC-1464, ex-YFN-1229
 YC-1498, later YPD-45,
 YC-1525, later YLC-5
 YC 1596, later YFN-1289
 YC-1680, ex-YFN-1195

The YCK hull symbol denoted a wooden barge.

 YCK-1, lost due to enemy action at Wake Island, December 1941
 YCK-2, ex-YF-422, lost 5 November 1943
 YCK-3, ex-YF-423
 YCK-4, ex-YF-424
 YCK-5, ex-YF-425
 YCK-6, ex-YF-426
 YCK-7, ex-YF-427
 YCK-8, ex-YF-428, sank 2.7 miles off Key West, Florida on 12 December 1943 while under tow by Army tug LT-4
 YCK-9, ex-YF-429
 YCK-10, ex-YF-430
 YCK-11, ex-YF-431
 YCK-12, ex-YF-432
 YCK-13, ex-YF-433
 YCK-14, ex-YF-434
 YCK-15, ex-YF-435
 YCK-16, ex-YF-436
 YCK-17, ex-YF-437
 YCK-18, ex-YF-438
 YCK-19, ex-YF-439
 YCK-20, ex-YF-440
 YCK-21, ex-YF-441
 YCK-22, ex-YF-442

Coaling Derricks (YCD) 
 YCD-1, ex-YC-415, later YOS-1

Car Floats (YCF) 

 YCF-5, ex-YO-37, ex-YE-14, ex-YA-18, later YFN-570
 YCF-23, lost en route to Eniwetok March 1945
 YCF-29, lost en route to Eniwetok March 1945
 YCF-36, lost en route to Eniwetok March 1945
 YCF-37, lost en route to Eniwetok March 1945
 YCF-42, lost December 1944
 YCF-59, lost off Delaware January 1945
 YCF-73, later YFN-1126
 YCF-81, later YFN-1127
 YCF-86, later YFN-1128
 YCF-87, later YFN-1129
 YCF-88, later YFN-1130
 YCF-90, later YFN-1131
 YCF-91, later YFN-1132
 YCF-92, later YFN-1133
 YCF-93, later YFN-1134
 YCF-94, later YFN-1135

Aircraft Transportation Barges (YCV) 
 YCV-6, later YFN-1093

Floating Derricks (YD) 

 YD-19, lost to enemy action in the Philippines
 YD-23, ex-YR-1
 YD-36, ex-YFN-72
 YD-37, later YFN-196
 YD-39, later YFN-197
 YD-47, lost to enemy action in the Philippines
 YD-56, lost to enemy action in the Philippines
 YD-60, lost to enemy action in the Philippines
 YD-171, German war prize Schwimmkran nr. 1
 YD-222, ex-US Army BD 6652, later IX-533

Degaussing Craft (YDG)

Diving Tenders (YDT) 
 YDT-11, ex-YFN-723, ex-YFNB-12, later YRST-1, IX-526, YR-94
 Phoebus (YDT-14), ex-YF-294

Ammunition Barges (YE) 

 YE-4, later YFN-229
 YE-8, later YFN-230, lost 1942
 YE-11, later YFN-231
 YE-14, ex-YO-37, later YA-18, YCF-5, YFN-570
 YE-15, later YFN-232
 YE-16, later YFN-233
 YE-32, later YC-484, YFN-236
 YE-33, later YC-485, YFN-237
 YE-34, later YC-292, YFN-238
 YE-36, later YC-468, YFN-240
 YE-37, later YC-469, YFN-241
 YE-38, later YC-282, YFN-242
 YE-39, later YC-271, YFN-243

Covered Barges (YF, YFN) 
YF barges are self-propelled, YFN barges are not.

Hull numbers 1 through 256 were built before World War II.

 YF-4, captured Philippines 1942
 YF-5, captured Philippines 1942
 YF-6, captured Philippines 1942
 YF-23, lost
 YFN-48, ex-YC-119
 YF-53, ex-YC-210
 YF-54, ex-YA-44
 YF-55, ex-ferry St. Helena
 YF-56, ex-YA-43
 YF-57, lost 1921
 YFN-70, ex-YC-326
 YFN-71, ex-YC-327
 YFN-72, later YD-36
 YFN-74 ex-YC-331
 YFN-75, ex-YC-332
 YFN-76, ex-YC-333
 YF-77, later YR-11
 YFN-83, ex-YC-351
 YFN-84, ex-YC-352, destroyed 1943
 YFN-85, ex-YC-353
 YFN-86, ex-YC-174, lost Philippines 1942
 YFN-87, ex-YC-446
 YFN-88, ex-YC-363
 YFN-89, ex-YC-364
 YFN-90, ex-YC-328
 YFN-91, ex-YC-329
 YFN-111, ex-YC-412
 YF-117, later YR-12
 YFN-131, ex-YV-26
 YFN-133, ex-YV-31
 YFN-135, ex-YV-34
 YFN-137, ex-YV-53
 YFN-138, ex-YV-60
 YFN-162, ex-YC-179
 YF-177, lost Philippines 1942
 YF-178, lost Philippines 1942
 YF-179, lost Philippines 1942
 YF-180, lost Philippines 1942
 YF-181, lost Philippines 1942
 YFN-182, ex-YS-72
 YFN-183, ex-YS-73
 YFN-184, ex-YS-75
 YFN-186, ex-YC-480
 YFN-187, ex-YC-303
 YFN-196, ex-YD-37
 YFN-197, ex-YD-39
 YFN-198, ex-YC-239
 YFN-199, ex-YC-383
 YFN-200, ex-YC-246
 YFN-208, ex-YC-275
 YFN-209, ex-YC-276
 YFN-211, ex-YC-203
 YF-212, lost due to enemy action in the Philippines 1942
 YFN-217, ex-YC-321
 YFN-218, ex-YC-467
 YFN-220, ex-YC-504
 YF-223, lost due to enemy action in the Philippines 1942
 YF-224, lost due to enemy action in the Philippines 1942
 YFN-225, ex-YC-291
 YFN-226, ex-YC-488
 YFN-229, ex-YE-4
 YFN-230, ex-YE-8, lost due to enemy action in the Philippines 1942
 YFN-231, ex-YE-11
 YFN-232, ex-YE-15
 YFN-233, ex-YE-16
 YFN-236, ex-YE-32, ex-YC-484
 YFN-237, ex-YE-33, ex-YC-485
 YFN-238, ex-YE-34, ex-YC-292
 YFN-239, later YC-280, later YRB-14
 YFN-240, ex-YE-36, ex-YC-468
 YFN-241, ex-YE-37, ex-YC-469
 YFN-242, ex-YE-38, ex-YC-282
 YFN-243, ex-YE-39, ex-YC-271
 YFN-244, ex-YC-273
 YFN-245, ex-YC-462
 YFN-246, ex-YC-285
 YFN-247, ex-YC-311
 YFN-248, ex-YC-278
 YFN-249, ex-YC-315
 YFN-250, ex-YC-261
 YFN-251, ex-YC-264
 YFN-253, ex-YC-295
 YFN-254, ex-YC-284
 YFN-255, ex-YC-305
 YFN-256, ex-YC-623

Hull numbers 257 through 1153 were built during World War II.

 YF-257, later YFRT-257
 YFN-258, later YRB-1
 YFN-268, later YFND-5, later IX-530
 YFN-271, later YRB-8
 YFN-285, later YC-1349
 YF-287, later YFRT-287
 YF-294, later Phoebus (YDT-14)
 YFN-298, later YRB-25 
 YFN-310, later YRB-2
 YFN-312, later YRB-7
 YFN-317, lost due to enemy action in the Philippines 1942
 YFN-318, ex-AMC-60
 YF-331, ex-Intrepid, later YSR-42
 YFN-333, later YRR-3
 YF-334, later YC-813
 YFN-365, later YRL-5, YR-83
 YFN-373, wrecked on Tanaga Island 1946
 YF-379 through YF-391, canceled
 YFN-396, later YC-1037
 YF-401, lost 20 June 1943
 YFN-402, later YRB-17
 YFN-409, later YRB-18
 YF-411, later YFRT-411
 YF-415, exploded and sank 11 May 1944
 YF-418, later YFRT-418
 YF-419, later YFRT-419
 YF-422, later YCK-2
 YF-423, later YCK-3
 YF-424, later YCK-4
 YF-425, later YCK-5
 YF-426, later YCK-6
 YF-427, later YCK-7
 YF-428, later YCK-8
 YF-429, later YCK-9
 YF-430, later YCK-10
 YF-431, later YCK-11
 YF-432, later YCK-12
 YF-433, later YCK-13
 YF-434, later YCK-14
 YF-435, later YCK-15
 YF-436, later YCK-16
 YF-437, later YCK-17
 YF-438, later YCK-18
 YF-439, later YCK-19
 YF-440, later YCK-20
 YF-441, later YCK-21
 YF-442, later YCK-22
 YF-447, later YFR-447
 YF-451, later YFR-451
 YFN-462, later YFT-6
 YFN-470, later YRB-3 (sources differ)
 YFN-474, later YRB-3 (sources differ)
 YFN-475, later YRB-4
 YFN-476, destroyed 1947
 YFN-477, later YRB-5
 YFN-480, later YRB-6
 YF-487, lost in the Caribbean Sea 18 July 1943
 YFN-493, later YRB-9
 YFN-508, later YC-1355
 YFN-511, later YRB-15
 YFN-515, later YRB-19
 YFN-516, later YRB-20
 YF-519, later YFRT-519
 YF-520, later YFRT-520
 YF-523, later YNG-42
 YF-528, later YNG-43
 YFN-540, ex-YC-650
 YF-568, ex-YAG-22
 YFN-570, ex-YO-37, ex-YE-14, ex-YA-18, ex-YCF-5
 YF-575, lost off Atlantic City, New Jersey, 6 May 1943
 YF-579, lost at San Francisco, California, 20 September 1943
 YF-586, later YC-1219
 YF-587, later YC-1220, YRB-13
 YFN-589, lost
 YF-608, later APL-14
 YF-609, later APL-15
 YFN-624, later YFNB-7
 YF-628, later APL-17
 YF-629, later APL-18
 YF-630, later APL-19, sunk as target 2002
 YF-631, later APL-20
 YF-632, later APL-21
 YF-633, later APL-22
 YFN-637, later YC-1353
 YFN-653, later YFP-5
 YFN-655, later YFP-6
 YF-672, ex-YPK-4, ex-YC-463
 YFN-674, ex-YC-263, later YHB-36
 YF-675, canceled
 YFN-676, ex-YC-860
 YFN-677, ex-YC-861
 YFN-678, later YC-862, later YRB-10
 YF-681 - damaged in the 10 November 1944 explosion of USS Mount Hood (AE-11) in Seeadler Harbor at Manus Island
 YFN-685, later YRR-4, YR-89
 YFN-699, later YC-1354
 YFN-701, lost 1946
 YFN-703, lost 1946
 YFN-713, later YRB-28
 YFN-723, later YFNB-12, YDT-11, YRST-1, IX-526, YR-94
 YFN-724, lost off the Farallone Islands 22 March 1945
 YFN-725, lost off the Farallone Islands 22 March 1945
 YFN-740, later YRBM-19, YFNB-19, YRBM-56
 YF-744 - grounded at Buckner Bay, Okinawa, by Typhoon Louise in October 1945
 YFN-751, later YFNB-26, YRBM-20
 YFN-752, later YFNB-27
 YFN-753, later YFNB-28
 YF-757 - sank at Buckner Bay, Okinawa, by Typhoon Louise in October 1945
 YFN-775, lost 1946
 YFN-777, lost at Eniwetok, 6 August 1945
 YFN-779, lost 1946
 YFN-780, lost 1946
 YFN-811, Project SHAD asset
 YFN-845, later YRB-21
 YF-852, later YFRT-523
 YF-853, canceled
 YF-854, later Littlehales (AGSC-15)
 YF-855 through YF-860 canceled
 YF-866, sunk as target 1988
 YFN-888, deployed to South Vietnam, sunk as target 1987
 YFN-889, deployed to South Vietnam, possibly transferred
 YFN-890, deployed to South Vietnam
 YFN-894, canceled
 YFN-895, canceled
 YFN-899, later YFNB-30, YR-93
 YFN-904, later YC-1356
 YFN-926, lost en route to Pearl Harbor, 8 March 1945
 YFN-938, later YC-1343
 YFN-961, later YRB-16
 YFN-971, lost 1946
 YFN-975, canceled
 YFN-976, cancelled
 YFN-985, later YFP-7
 YFN-986, later YFP-8
 YFN-1007, lost 1948
 YFN-1008, later YC-1212
 YFN-1009, later YC-1213
 YF-1017 through YF-1022, canceled
 YF-1023, later YFL-25
 YF-1053, canceled
 YFN-1062, later YFNB-35, YPD-46
 YFN-1064, later YFNB-37, YRB-30
 YF-1079, ex-LST-39, ran aground and damaged at Buckner Bay, Okinawa, during Typhoon Louise in October 1945
 YF-1080, ex-YP-90
 YF-1092, later YFN-1092, YFNX-13, YRST-5, YRB-29
 YF-1094, ex-YC-1291
 YF-1095, ex-YC-1292
 YF-1096, ex-YC-1293
 YF-1097, ex-YC-1294
 YF-1098, ex-YC-1295
 YF-1099 through YF-1123, canceled
 YFN-1124, ex-sonar barge
 YFN-1125, ex-Sonar Barge
 YFN-1126, ex-YCF-73
 YFN-1127, ex-YCF-81
 YFN-1128, ex-YCF-86
 YFN-1129, ex-YCF-87
 YFN-1130, ex-YCF-88
 YFN-1131, ex-YCF-90
 YFN-1132, ex-YCF-91
 YFN-1133, ex-YCF-92
 YFN-1134, ex-YCF-93
 YFN-1135, ex-YCF-94
 YFN-1149, ex-YC-908
 YFN-1151, ex-YC-792
 YFN-1152, ex-YP-629, later YFRN-1152
 YFN-1153, ex-YC-805

Hull numbers starting with 1154 were built after World War II.

 YFN-1162, later YFP-13
 YFN-1170, later YRB-27
 YFN-1192, later YLC-1
 YFN-1195, later YC-1680
 YFN-1207, later YFP-11
 YFN-1209, later YFND-31
 YFN-1216, later YFP-12
 YFN-1226, later YC-1461
 YFN-1227, later YC-1462
 YFN-1228, later YC-1463
 YFN-1229, later YC-1464
 YFN-1253, later YFND-30
 YFN-1259, later IX-527, submarine test support barge
 YFN-1268, later YR-96
 YFN-1288, ex-YC-1378
 YFN-1289, ex-YC 1596

Yard Ferry Boats or Launches (YFB)

 Asp (YFB-1)
 Admiral Glass (YFB-2)
 Berceau (YFB-3)
 Cyane (YFB-4)
 Ripple (YFB-5)
 Despatch (YFB-6)
 Leslie (YFB-7)
 Navy Yard (YFB-8)
 Wave (YFB-10)
 Callao (YFB-11)
 San Felipe (YFB-12), lost due to enemy action at Luzon, Philippines
 Christine (YFB-13) 
 Aquidneck (YFB-14)
 Conanicut (YFB-15)
 Manuwai (YFB-16)
 Nihoa (YFB-17)
 Monhegan (YFB-18)
 Vashon (YFB-19)
 League Island (YFB-20)
 Calistoga (YFB-21)
 Jewel (YFB-22)
 Senibeil (YFB-23)
 Treasure (YFB-24)
 Captiva (YFB-25)
 Falkner (YFB-26)
 Adak (YFB-28)
 Pilgrim II (YFB-30)
 Gould Island (YFB-31)
 Green Island (YFB-32)
 Santa Rosa (YFB-33)
 San Leandro (YFB-34)
 Sequin (YFB-35)
 Staten (YFB-36)
 Dewees (YFB-37)
 Seabrook (YFB-38)
 Calodosi (YFB-39)
 Quonset (YFB-40)
 Lillian Anne (YFB-41)
 Asquith (YFB-42)
 Colington (YFB-43)
 Royston (YFB-44)
 Sheffield (YFB-45)
 North (YFB-46)
 YFB-47
 YFB-48
 Metinic (YFB-49)
 Magdalena (YFB-54)
 Delta King (YFB-55), ex-YHB-6
 Delta Queen (YFB-56), ex-YHB-7
 San Felipe (YFB-57)
 Lacosta (YFB-58)
 Arrowsic (YFB-59)
 YFB-60
 YFB-65
 YFB-66
 San Felipe (YFB-79)
 YFB-82
 Waa Hele Honoa (YFB-83)
 YFB-86
 Moko Holo Hele (YFB-87)
 YFB-88 through YFB-95
 YFB-132
 Dart (YFB-308)
 Santa Rita (YFB-681)
 Rosal (YFB-682), lost due to enemy action at Luzon, Philippines
 Camia (YFB-683), lost due to enemy action at Cavite, Luzon, Philippines
 Dapdap (YFB-684), lost due to enemy action at Luzon, Philippines
 Rivera (YFB-685), lost due to enemy action at Luzon, Philippines
 Magdalena (YFB-687), lost due to enemy action at Luzon, Philippines
 Yacal (YFB-688), lost due to enemy action at Luzon, Philippines
 Taposa (YFB-1163)
 Patchogue (YFB-1227), ex-ID-1227
 YFB-1504
 YFB-1516
 Porpoise (YFB-2047), ex-ID-2047
 YFB-2494
 Atlantic (YFB-3268)
 YFB-4753

Yard Floating Drydocks (YFD) 

All YFDs were reclassified as AFDMs in 1945 (see ).

 Dewey (YFD-1), scuttled 8 April 1942 in the Philippines, raised by the Japanese and sunk again by US aircraft on 13 November 1944
 YFD-2 
 YFD-3
 YFD-4
 YFD-5
 YFD-6
 YFD-7 through YFD-19
 YFD-20, lost off California 31 January 1943
 YFD-21
 YFD-22 through YFD-61
 YFD-62
 YFD-63
 YFD-64
 YFD-65
 YFD-66
 YFD-67
 YFD-68 through YFD-70
 YFD-71
 YFD-72 through YFD-82

Large Covered Barges, non-self propelled (YFNB) 

 YFNB-7, ex-YFN-624
 YFNB-12, ex-YFN-723, later YDT-11, YRST-1, IX-526, YR-94
 YFNB-19, ex-YFN-740, ex-YRBM-19, later YRBM-56
 YFNB-21, later YRBM-16
 YFNB-24, later YRBM-17
 YFNB-26, ex-YFN-751, later YRBM-20
 YFNB-27, ex-YFN-752
 YFNB-28, ex-YFN-753
 YFNB-30, ex-YFN-899, later YR-93
 YFNB-35, ex-YFN-1062, later YPD-46
 YFNB-37, ex-YFN-1064, later YRB-30
 YFNB-42, later YRBM-47

Dry Dock Companion Craft, non-self propelled (YFND) 
 YFND-5, ex-YFN-268, later IX-530
 YFND-30, ex-YFN-1253
 YFND-31, ex-YFN-1209

Barges, special purpose, non-self propelled (YFNX) 
 YFNX-13, ex-YF-1092, ex-YFN-1092, later YRST-5, later YRB-29

Floating Power Barges (YFP) 

 YFP-5, ex-YFN-653
 YFP-6, ex-YFN-655
 YFP-7, ex-YFN-985
 YFP-8, ex-YFN-986
 YFP-11, ex-YFN-1207 
 YFP-12, ex-YFN-1216
 YFP-13, ex-YFN-1162

Refrigerated Covered Barges (YFR, YFRN) 
YFR barges are self-propelled, YFRN barges are not.

The YFR and YFRN hull numbers are part of the YF and YFN sequence.
 YFR-443, ex-YF-443, transferred to Columbia
 YFR-447, ex-YF-447
 YFR-451, ex-YF-451, lost by explosion and fire, 14 miles northwest of Boston MA. harbor, 11 May 1944
 YFRN-833 through YFRN-841
 YFR-888 through YFR-890
 YFRN-997
 YFRN-1152, ex-YP-629, ex-YFN-1152

Range Tenders (YFRT) 

 YFRT-257, ex-YF-257
 YFRT-287, ex-YF-287
 YFRT-411, ex-YF-411 
 YFRT-418, ex-YF-418
 YFRT-419, ex-YF-419
 YFRT-519, ex-YF-519
 YFRT-520, ex-YF-520
 YFRT-523, ex-YF-852
 YFRT-524, ex-T-AG-161

Torpedo Transportation Barges (YFT) 
 YFT-6, ex-YFN-462

Harbor Utility Craft (YFU) 
YFU-71-class: 11 "Skilak" lighters purchased as Commercial off-the-shelf for the Vietnam War
 YUF-71, lead ship of class
 YFU-73, transferred to Cambodia
 YFU-78, destroyed in rocket attack, Da Nang Bridge Ramp, Vietnam, 1969, with loss of most of the crew
 YFU-79, later Baylander (IX-514), converted to a helicopter Landing Ship in 1986 for pilot training, nicknamed the "world's smallest aircraft carrier"
 YFU-81, transferred to Panama
 YFU-82, later IX-506

Garbage Barges (YG, YGN) 
YG barges are self-propelled, YGN barges are not.

 YG-5
 YG-17, Pearl Harbor attack participant
 YG-22, lead ship of class
 YG-29
 YG-39, lost 27 September 1944
 YG-44, lost at Pearl Harbor, 7 February 1945
 YG-51
 YG-53
 YGN-70

Ambulance Boats / Small Medical Support Vessels (YH) 
 YH-1
 YH-2
 YH-3
 YH-4

Houseboats (YHB) 
 Delta King (YHB-6), later YFB-55
 Delta Queen (YHB-7), later YFB-56
 YHB-15, later YAG-20
 YHB-17, later YAG-21
 YHB-36, ex-YC-263, ex-YFN-674

Salvage Lift Craft, Heavy (YHLC) 
 Crilley (YHLC 1)
 Crandall (YHLC-2)

Heating Scows (YHT)

Open Landing Barges (YLA)

Salvage Lift Craft (YLC) 
 YLC-1, ex-YFN-1192
 YLC-5, ex-YC-1525

Salvage Lift Craft, Light (YLLC) 
 YLLC-1, ex-LCU-1348, transferred to South Vietnam

Dredges (YM, YMN) 
YM dredges are self-propelled, YMN dredges are not.

 YM-2
 YM-4 lost due to enemy action in the Philippines
 YM-5, scavenged to build YM-11
 YM-11
 YM-13, captured at Guam 10 December 1941
 YM-37
 Seabee (YM-38)

Mud Scows (YMD) 
 YMD-8

Salvage Lift Craft Medium (YMLC) 
 YMLC-3, ex-LSM-551, ex-Salvager (ARS(D)-3)
 YMLC-4, ex-LSM-552, ex-Windlass (ARS(D)-4)

Motor Mineplanters (YMP)

Auxiliary Motor Mine Sweepers (YMS)

Yard Motor Tugs (YMT) 
 YMT-1 through YMT-31

Yard Net Tenders (YN) 

All specially-built yard net tenders were reclassified in 1944 as auxiliary net laying ships, see  for the reclassification result. The 24 impressed tugboats were reclassed as net tender tugs (YNT), later some as tugboats (YTB or YTL).

Aloe-class net laying ships

 Aloe (YN-1)
 Ash (YN-2)
 Boxwood (YN-3)
 Butternut (YN-4)
 Catalpa (YN-5)
 Chestnut (YN-6)
 Cinchona (YN-7)
 Buckeye (YN-8)
 Buckthorn (YN-9)
 Ebony (YN-10)
 Eucalyptus (YN-11)
 Chinquapin (YN-12)
 Gum Tree (YN-13)
 Holly (YN-14)
 Elder (YN-15)
 Larch (YN-16)
 Locust (YN-17)
 Mahogany (YN-18)
 Mango (YN-19)
 Hackberry (YN-20)
 Mimosa (YN-21)
 Mulberry (YN-22)
 Palm (YN-23)
 Hazel (YN-24)
 Redwood (YN-25)
 Rosewood (YN-26)
 Sandalwood (YN-27)
 Nutmeg (YN-28)
 Teaberry (YN-29)
 Teak (YN-30)
 Pepperwood (YN-31)
 Yew (YN-32)

The 24 impressed commercial tugboats.

 Hopocan (YN-33)
 Menewa (YN-34)
 Oneka (YN-35)
 Mahaska (YN-36)
 Keshena (YN-37)
 Canasatego (YN-38)
 Donacona (YN-39)
 Mankato (YN-40)
 Metea (YN-41)
 Okisko (YN-42)
 Tahchee (YN-43)
 Tamaha (YN-44)
 Wapasha (YN-45)
 Namontack (YN-46)
 Cockenoe (YN-47)
 Katlian (YN-48)
 Neswage (YN-49)
 Annawan (YN-50)
 Metacom (YN-51)
 Tamaque (YN-52)
 Marin (YN-53), ex-AMc-31
 Noka (YN-54)
 Nawat (YN-55)
 Wapello (YN-56)

Ailanthus-class net laying ships

 Ailanthus (YN-57)
 Bitterbush (YN-58)
 Anaqua (YN-59)
 Baretta (YN-60)
 Cliffrose (YN-61)
 Satinleaf (YN-62)
 Corkwood (YN-63)
 Cornel (YN-64)
 Mastic (YN-65)
 Canotia (YN-66)
 Lancewood (YN-67)
 Papaya (YN-68)
 Cinnamon (YN-69)
 Silverbell (YN-70)
 Snowbell (YN-71)
 Spicewood (YN-72)
 Manchineel (YN-73)
 Torchwood (YN-74)
 Winterberry (YN-75)
 Viburnum (YN-76)
 Abele (YN-77)
 Terebinth (YN-78)
 Precept (YN-79)
 Boxelder (YN-80)
 Catclaw (YN-81)
 Chinaberry (YN-82)
 Hoptree (YN-83)
 Whitewood (YN-84)
 Palo Blanco (YN-85)
 Palo Verde (YN-86)
 Pinon (YN-87)
 Prefect (YN-88)
 Satinwood (YN-89)
 Seagrape (YN-90)
 Shellbark (YN-91)
 Silverleaf (YN-92)
 Stagbush (YN-93)
 Allthorn (YN-94)
 Tesota (YN-95)
 Yaupon (YN-96)

Cohoes-class net laying ships

 Cohoes (YN-97)
 Etlah (YN-98)
 Suncook (YN-99)
 Manayunk (YN-100)
 Marietta (YN-101)
 Nahant (YN-102)
 Naubuc (YN-109)
 Oneota (YN-110)
 Passaconaway (YN-111)
 Passaic (YN-113)
 Shakamaxon (YN-114)
 Tonawanda (YN-115)
 Tunxis (YN-119)
 Waxsaw (YN-120)
 Yazoo (YN-121)

Net Gate Craft (YNG) 
 YNG-1 
 YNG-20, ex-AM-17
 YNG-42, ex-YF-523
 YNG-43, ex-YF-528

Net Tender Tugs (YNT) 
All these ships were former Yard Net Tenders (YN)

 Hopocan (YNT-1)
 Menewa (YNT-2)
 Oneka (YNT-3)
 Mahaska (YNT-4)
 Keshena (YNT-5)
 Canasatego (YNT-6)
 Donacona (YNT-7)
 Mankato (YNT-8)
 Metea (YNT-9)
 Okisko (YNT-10), later YTL-735
 Nawat (YNT-11)
 Tamaha (YNT-12)
 Wapasha (YNT-13), later YTB-737
 Namontack (YNT-14), later YTB-738
 Cockenoe (YNT-15) 
 Katlian (YNT-16) 
 Neswage (YNT-17) 
 Annawan (YNT-18) 
 Metacom (YNT-19) 
 Tamaque (YNT-20) 
 Marin (YNT-21)
 Noka (YNT-22)
 Nawat (YNT-23)
 Wapello (YNT-24)

Fuel Oil Barges (YO, YON) 
YO barges are self-propelled, YON barges are not.

 YO-10, ex-YW-2, later YR-19
 YO-37, later YE-14, YA-18, YCF-5, YFN-570
 YO-41 - sank 22 February 1942 during enemy action in the Philippines 
 YO-42 - sank 22 February 1942 during enemy action in the Philippines
 USS Syncline (YO-63) - sank in 1972 north of Tahiti
 YO-64 - sank due to enemy action in the Philippines in January 1942
 YO-77 - damaged in the 10 November 1944 explosion of USS Mount Hood (AE-11) in Seeadler Harbor at Manus Island
 YO-146 - sank in accident July 1957
 YO-156 - lost at Sitka, Alaska in May 1945
 YO-157 - lost at Sitka, Alaska in May 1945
 YON-160 - sank in Operation Crossroads as an atomic bomb target at Bikini Atoll on 25 July 1946
 YO-161 - sank at Eniwetok 29 November 1946
 YON-184 - sank at Eniwetok in a typhoon in September 1946
 YO-185 - sank off Saipan 16 March 1946
 YO-186 - sank off Guam 5 April 1948
 YON-187, later YWN-148
 YO-196, ex-YOGN-196
 YON-252, ex-YOGN-123
 YON-367, ex-YOGN-119

Gasoline Barges (YOG, YOGN) 
YOG barges are self-propelled, YOGN barges are not.

 YOG-32, later YWN-157
 YOG-33, transferred to South Vietnam
 YOG-42 - under tow by USS Navajo (AT-64) when Navajo was torpedoed and sunk by Japanese submarine I-39 on 12 September 1943, 150 miles East of Espiritu Santo, recovered by USS Sioux (AT-75), later YOGN-42, intentionally beached on Lanai, Hawaiian Islands in 1950
 YOG-56, transferred to South Vietnam
 YOG-66, transferred to South Vietnam
 YOG-71, transferred to South Vietnam
 YOG-76 - sank on 13 November 1969 in Cua Viet Cove, South Vietnam after two underwater explosions hit her, refloated and taken to Da Nang, South Vietnam, not repaired due to severe damage
 YOG-80, transferred to South Vietnam
 YOG-83 - sank off Kwajalein 16 September 1948
 YOG-84 - lost during typhoon at sea off Saipan 14 November 1948
 YOG-93, later IX-523 (training hulk for boarding party tactics)
 YOGN-116, later YWN-156
 YOGN-119, later YON-367
 YOGN-123, later YON-252
 YOGN-125, ex-YWN-154, later YON
 YOG-131, transferred to South Vietnam
 YOGN-196, later YO-196

Oil Storage Barges (YOS) 
 YOS-1, ex-YC-415, ex-YCD-1

Patrol Craft (YP) 

 YP-3, ex-USS Sanda
 USS Milan (YP-6), ex-WCG-209
 YP-10, ex-CG-194
 YP-15, ex-CG-149
 YP-16, ex-CG-267, destroyed 10 December 1941 at Guam
 YP-17, ex-CG-275, captured 10 December 1941 at Guam
 YP-18, ex-CG-263
 YP-19, ex-CG-177
 YP-26, ex-CG-252, destroyed by an explosion in 1942 while beached in a shipyard in the Panama Canal Zone
 YP-29, ex-CG-116
 YP-45, ex-CG-133
 YP-49, ex-CG-182
 YP-51, ex-CG-261

During World War II many private fishing and United States Fish & Wildlife Service (US FWS) vessels were pressed into naval service as patrol craft. A small number would be modified for delivering refrigerated food to small isolated island bases, most without any reclassification.

 YP-72, ex-Cavalcade, wrecked in Kuluk Bay, Alaska on 17 February 1943
 YP-73, ex-Corsair, wrecked in Kodiak, Alaska, on 15 January 1945, 10 killed
 YP-74, ex-Endeavor, sunk in collision off Unimak Island, Alaska on 6 September 1942, 4 killed
 YP-77, ex-PC-528
 YP-90, later YF-1080
 YP-105, ex-PC-510
 YP-148, ex-Western Queen
 YP-150, later AMc-149, IX-177
 YP-152, ex-Western Traveler
 YP-153, ex-Waldero
 YP-155, ex-Storm
 YP-179, ex-SP-179 
 YP-198, ex-SP-588, ex-US FWS Eider
 YP-199, ex-US FWS Kittiwake
 YP-200, ex-SP-624, ex-US FWS Widgeon
 YP-239 - wrecked at Buckner Bay, Okinawa, by Typhoon Louise in October 1945
 YP-214, ex-SP-214
 YP-251, ex-Foremost
 YP-258, later PYc-30
 YP-278, ex-Liberty, small refrigerated cargo vessel
 YP-279, ex-Navigator, foundered in heavy weather off Townsville, Australia, on 5 September 1943
 YP-284, ex-Endeavor, sunk by Japanese destroyers off Guadalcanal on 25 October 1942, 1 killed
 YP-289 - wrecked at Buckner Bay, Okinawa, by Typhoon Louise in October 1945
 YP-290, ex-Picoroto
 YP-345, ex-Yankee, disappeared between French Frigate Shoals and Midway Island on 31 October 1942, 17 killed
 YP-346, ex-Prospect, damaged and beached by Japanese 9 September 1942, destroyed 10 September 1942, 1 killed
 YP-375, ex-AMb-17, later IX-199
 YP-389, ex-Cohasset, ex-AMc-202, sunk by U-701 near Diamond Shoals on 19 June 1942, 6 killed
 YP-399, ex-Big Dipper
 YP-400
 YP-422, ex-Mist, briefly commanded by L. Ron Hubbard
 YP-448 - later IX-200
 YP-449 - later IX-201
 YP-506, ex-ID-1217 
 YP-617 - small refrigerated cargo vessel
 YP-618 - small refrigerated cargo vessel
 YP-629, later YFN-1152, YFRN-1152
 YP-663, ex-SP-663 (duplicate number from after WWI)
 YP-714, ex-SP-714 (duplicate number from after WWI)

Later purpose-built yard patrol craft would be assigned mainly to train US Naval Academy and US Merchant Marine Academy midshipmen.
 YP-654 through YP-675
 YP-676 through YP-682
 YP-683 through YP-702
 YP-703 through YP-708

Floating Pile Drivers (YPD) 
 YPD-22, lost due to enemy action in the Philippines
 YPD-36
 YPD-37, ex-YSD-61
 YPD-45, ex-YC-1498
 YPD-46, ex-YFN-1062, ex-YFNB-35

Pontoon Storage Barges (YPK) 
 YPK-4, later YC-463, YF-672
 YPK-6, lost due to enemy action in the Philippines
 YPK-7, lost due to enemy action in the Philippines

Floating Workshops (YR) 

 YR-1, later YD-23
 YR-2
 YR-3
 YR-4, reported missing
 YR-5, ex-YC-164
 YR-6
 YR-7
 YR-8, ex-YC-455
 YR-9, ex-YC-456
 YR-10
 YR-11, ex-YF-77
 YR-12, ex-YF-117
 YR-13 through YR-18
 YR-19, ex-YW-2, ex-YO-10
 YR-20, ex-YC-274
 YR-21, ex-YC-294
 YR-22, ex-YC-296
 YR-23, ex-YC-701
 YR-24
 YR-25
 YR-26, ex-YRR-5
 YR-27 through YR-30
 YR-31, later YRR-7, later YR-90
 YR-32, later YRR-8
 YR-33	through YR-35
 YR-36, later YRB-31, later YRBM-54
 YR-37
 YR-38
 YR-39, later YRR-6
 YR-40
 YR-41
 YR-42, ex-YTT-3
 YR-43, lost in the Gulf of Alaska, 28 March 1945
 YR-44, later YRBM-48
 YR-45
 YR-46, later YRBM-49
 YR-47
 YR-48
 YR-49, later YRR-1
 YR-50, later YRBM-50
 YR-51
 YR-52, later YRDM-1
 YR-53, later YRDM-2
 YR-54, later YRDM-3, YRR-13
 YR-55, later YRDH-1, later IX-528 submarine test support barge
 YR-56, later YRDH-2
 YR-57, later YRDH-3, later YRR-11
 YR-58
 YR-59
 YR-60, later YRBM-51
 YR-61
 YR-62
 YR-63, later YRB-36
 YR-64 through YR-66
 YR-67, later YRB-32
 YR-68, later YRB-34
 YR-69 through YR-72
 YR-73, later YRB-33
 YR-74, later YRR-2
 YR-75
 YR-76
 YR-77, later YRBM-52
 YR-78, later YRB-35, later YRBM-55
 YR-79, later YRR-10
 YR-80, canceled
 YR-81, canceled
 YR-82, canceled
 YR-83, ex-YFN-365, ex-YRL-5
 YR-84, ex-FMS 6
 YR-85, ex-FMS 387
 YR-86, ex-FMS 811
 YR-87
 YR-88, ex-YR 32, YRR 8
 YR-89, ex-YFN-685, ex-YRR-4
 YR-90, ex-YR-31, ex-YRR-7
 YR-91, later YRBM-53
 YR-92, ex-YC-1079, ex-YRB-22
 YR-93, ex-YFN-899, ex-YFNB-30
 YR-94, ex-YFN-723, ex-YFNB-12, ex-YDT-11, ex-YRST-1, ex-IX-526
 YR-95, ex-Nestucca
 YR-96, ex-YFN-1268

Repair and Berthing Barges (YRB) 

 YRB-1, ex-YFN-258
 YRB-2, ex-YFN-310
 YRB-3, ex-YFN-470 or ex-YFN-474 (sources differ)
 YRB-4, ex-YFN-475
 YRB-5, ex-YFN-477
 YRB-6, ex-YFN-480
 YRB-7, ex-YFN-312
 YRB-8, ex-YFN-271
 YRB-9, ex-YFN-493
 YRB-10, ex-YFN-678, ex-YC-862
 YRB-11, ex-YC-293
 YRB-12, ex-YC-312
 YRB-13, ex-YF-587, ex-YC-1220
 YRB-14, ex-YFN-239, ex-YC-280
 YRB-15, ex-YFN-511
 YRB-16, ex-YFN-961
 YRB-17, ex-YFN-402
 YRB-18, ex-YFN-409
 YRB-19, ex-YFN-515
 YRB-20, ex-YFN-516
 YRB-21, ex-YFN-845
 YRB-22, ex-YC-1079, later YR-92
 YRB-23	 	 	 	 	 	 
 YRB-24	 	 	 	 	 	 
 YRB-25, ex-YFN-298
 YRB-26	 	 	 	 	 	 
 YRB-27, ex-YFN-1170
 YRB-28, ex-YFN-713
 YRB-29, ex-YF-1092, ex-YFN-1092, ex-YFNX-13, ex-YRST-5
 YRB-30, ex-YFN-1064, ex-YFNB-37
 YRB-31, ex-YR-36, later YRBM-54
 YRB-32, ex-YR-67
 YRB-33, ex-YR-73
 YRB-34, ex-YR-68
 YRB-35, ex-YR-78, later YRBM-55
 YRB-36, ex-YR-63

Repair, Berthing and Messing Barges (YRBM) 

 YRBM-1 through YRBM-15
 YRBM-16, ex-YFNB-21, transferred to South Vietnam
 YRBM-17, ex-YFNB-24
 YRBM-18, ex-APL-55
 YRBM-19, ex-YFN-740, later YFNB-19, YRBM-56
 YRBM-20, ex-YFN-751, YFNB-26
 YRBM-21 through YRBM-46
 YRBM-47, ex-YFNB-42
 YRBM-48, ex-YR-44
 YRBM-49, ex-YR-46
 YRBM-50, ex-YR-50
 YRBM-51, ex-YR-60
 YRBM-52, ex-YR-77
 YRBM-53, ex-YR-91
 YRBM-54, ex-YR-36, ex-YRB-31
 YRBM-55, ex-YR-78, ex-YRB-35
 YRBM-56, ex-YFN-740, ex-YRBM-19, ex-YFNB-19

Submarine Rescue Chambers (YRC) 
 YRC-4, lost due to enemy action in the Philippines

Floating Dry Dock Workshops, Hull (YRDH) 

 YRDH-1, ex-YR-55, later IX-528 submarine test support barge
 YRDH-2, ex-YR-56
 YRDH-3, ex-YR-57, later YRR-11
 YRDH-4, later YRR-12
 YRDH-5 through YRDH-8

Floating Dry Dock Workshops, Machine (YRDM) 

 YRDM-1, ex-YR-52
 YRDM-2, ex-YR-53
 YRDM-3, ex-YR-54, later YRR-13
 YRDM-4, later YRR-14
 YRDM-5 through YRDM-7
 YRDM-8, later YRR-5

Covered Barges Repair (YRL) 
 YRL-5, ex-YFN-365, later YR-83

Radiological Repair Barges (YRR) 

 YRR-1, ex-YR-49
 YRR-2, ex-YR-74
 YRR-3, ex-YFN-333
 YRR-4, ex-YFN-685, later YR-89
 YRR-5, ex-YRDM-8
 YRR-6, ex-YR-39
 YRR-7, ex-YR-31, later YR-90
 YRR-8, ex-YR-32, ex-YR-88
 YRR-9
 YRR-10, ex-YR-79
 YRR-11, ex-YR-57, ex-YRDH-3
 YRR-12, ex-YRDH-4
 YRR-13, ex-YR-54, ex-YRDM-3
 YRR-14, ex-YRDM-4

Salvage Craft Tenders (YRST) 
 YRST-1, ex-YFN-723, ex-YFNB-12, ex-YDT-11, later IX-526, later YR-94
 YRST-5, ex-YF-1092, ex-YFN-1092, ex-YFNX-13, later YRB-29

Stevedoring Barges (YS) 
 YS-72, later YFN-182
 YS-73, later YFN-183
 YS-75, later YFN-184
 YS-88 
 YS-110

Yard Seaplane Derricks (YSD) 

 YSD-1
 YSD-2
 YSD-4
 YSD-6 
 YSD-7 through YSD-10

YSD-11-class crane ship

 YSD-11 through YSD-13
 YSD-15 through YSD-27
 YSD-29 through YSD-37
 YSD-42 through YSD-50
 YSD-55
 YSD-59 through YSD-60
 YSD-61, later YPD-37
 YSD-62 through YSD-78

Salvage Barges (YSP) 
 YSP-44 - sunk 22 February 1942 during enemy action in the Philippines
 YSP-46 through YSP-50 - all sunk 22 February 1942 during enemy action in the Philippines

Sludge Removal Barges (YSR) 
 YSR-2 - sunk 22 February 1942 during enemy action in the Philippines
 YSR-42, ex-Intrepid, ex-YF-331

Yard Tugs (YT) 
Many of these tugs were later assigned YTB, YTL, or YTM classifications.

 Wahneta (YT-1)
 Iwana (YT-2)
 Narkeeta (YT-3)
 Unadilla (YT-4)
 Samoset (YT-5)
 Penacook (YT-6)
 Pawtucket (YT-7)
 Pentucket (YT-8)
 Sotoyomo (YT-9)
 Triton (YT-10)
 Fortune (YT-11)
 Cayuga (YT-12)
 Hercules (YT-13)
 Lively (YT-14)
 Massasoit (YT-15)
 Modoc (YT-16)
 Mohawk (YT-17)
 Nottoway (YT-18)
 Nyack (YT-19)
 Passaic (YT-20)
 Pawnee (YT-21)
 Rocket (YT-22)
 Sebago (YT-23)
 Tecumseh (YT-24)
 Vigilant (YT-25)
 Wicomico (YT-26)
 Wompatuck (YT-27)
 Advance (YT-28), ex-ID-3057
 Barnett (YT-29)
 Bouker No. 2 (YT-30), ex-SP-1275
 Saco (YT-31), ex-SP-2725
 Catawba (YT-32)
 Mendota (YT-33), ex-SP-773
 Dreadnaught (YT-34)
 Nausett (YT-35)
 Choptank (YT-36)
 Yuma (YT-37)
 John L. Lawrence (YT-38)
 Navigator (YT-39)
 Nonpareil (YT-40)
 Chase S. Osborne (YT-41)
 Penobscot (YT-42), ex-SP-982, later YTB-42
 Pocomoke (YT-43)
 Adirondack (YT-44)
 James Wooley (YT-45)
 YT-46 through YT-85
 YT-86 through YT-101
 Alida (YT-102)
 Balanga (YT-103)
 Banaag (YT-104), lost due to enemy action in the Philippines
 Barcelo (YT-105)
 Christine (YT-106)
 Iona (YT-107), sunk by Japanese aircraft at Cavite, Luzon, Philippine Islands, 2 January 1942
 Mercedes (YT-108), destroyed to prevent capture at Cavite, Luzon, Philippine Islands, 2 January 1942
 Peoria (YT-109)
 Uncas (YT-110), ex-AT-51
 YT-111
 Active (YT-112)
 Diligent (YT-113)
 Choctaw (YT-114)
 Reindeer (YT-115)
 Vaga (YT-116), scuttled to prevent capture off Corregidor, Luzon, Philippine Islands, 5 May 1942
 YT-117
 YT-118
 Geronimo (YT-119)
 Stallion (YT-120)
 Arapaho (YT-121)
 Tillamook (YT-122)
 Wando (YT-123), ex-AT-17, later YTB-123
 Chemung (YT-124), ex-AT-18
 Undaunted (YT-125)
 Challenge (YT-126), ex-SP-1015, ex-AT-59, later YTM-126
 Patriot (YT-127)
 Powhatan (YT-128)
 Osceola (YT-129)
 YT-130
 USS Massasoit (YT-131)
 YT-132
 Narkeeta (YT-133)
 Wahneta (YT-134)
 Cahokia (YT-135)
 Tamaroa (YT-136), ex-AT-62, later YTB-136
 J. M. Woodworth (YT-137)
 Woban (YT-138)
 Ala (YT-139)
 Wahtah (YT-140)
 Heekon (YT-141)
 Nokomis (YT-142)
 YT-143
 YT-144
 Montezuma (YT-145)
 
 Tazhia (YT-147)
 Wenonah (YT-148)
 Toka (YT-149)
 Woyot (YT-150)
 Konoka (YT-151)
 YT-152 through YT-169
 Alloway (YT-170)
 Yaquima (YT-171)
 Sparrow (YT-172)
 Manistee (YT-173)
 Allaquippa (YT-174)
 Chekilli (YT-175)
 Junaluska (YT-176)
 Black Fox (YT-177)
 Dekaury (YT-178)
 Lone Wolf (YT-179)
 Madokawando (YT-180)
 Mazapeta (YT-181)
 Mawkaw (YT-182)
 YT-184 through YT-186
 Canonicus (YT-187)
 Negwagon (YT-188)
 Nepanet (YT-189)
 Orono (YT-190)
 Osamekin (YT-191)
 Pessacus (YT-192)
 Sassacus (YT-193)
 Squanto (YT-194)
 Yonaguska (YT-195)
 YT-196 
 YT-197
 YT-198, sunk off Anzio, Italy, 18 February 1944
 YT-199 through YT-213
 Cahto (YT-215)
 Cochise (YT-216)
 Ensenore (YT-217)
 Achigan (YT-218)
 Hatak (YT-219)
 Iona (YT-220)
 Kabout (YT-221)
 Kasota (YT-222)
 Mahackemo (YT-223)
 Manada (YT-224)
 Maquinna (YT-225)
 Chaska (YT-226)
 Alamingo (YT-227)
 Alamuchee (YT-228)
 Alarka (YT-229)
 YT-230 through YT-237
 Bomazeen (YT-238)
 YT-239
 YT-240
 Uncas (YT-242)
 YT-243 through YT-245
 Tavibo (YT-246)
 YT-247, sunk 5 April 1944
 YT-248 through YT-251
 Dekanisora (YT-252)
 Anacot (YT-253)
 Menatonon (YT-254)
 Kennesaw (YT-255)
 Menoquet (YT-256)
 Minooka (YT-257)
 Moanahonga (YT-258)
 Arivaca (YT-259)
 Nasomee (YT-260)
 Nawona (YT-261)
 Oneyana (YT-262)
 Neoga (YT-263)
 Awatobi (YT-264)
 Hiawatha (YT-265)
 Pocahontas (YT-266)
 Pogatacut (YT-267)
 Red Cloud (YT-268)
 Sakarissa (YT-269)
 Satanta (YT-270)
 Minnehaha (YT-271)
 Iwana (YT-272)
 Tecumseh (YT-273)
 Pokagon (YT-274)
 Epanow (YT-275)
 Tavibo (YT-276)
 Onockatin (YT-277)
 Ossahinta (YT-278)
 Penacook (YT-279)
 Tuscola (YT-280)
 Peshewah (YT-281)
 Piomingo (YT-282)
 Pitchlynn (YT-283)
 Neokautah (YT-284)
 Poquim (YT-285)
 Quinnapin (YT-286)
 Sabeata (YT-287)
 Sagaunash (YT-288)
 Sakaweston (YT-289)
 Canocan (YT-290)
 YT-291 through YT-324
 Mamo (YT-325)
 Sacagawea (YT-326)
 Haiglar (YT-327)
 Mauvila (YT-328)
 YT-330
 Namequa (YT-331)
 YT-332
 YT-333
 Dekanawida (YT-334)
 Dohasan (YT-335)
 Skenandoa (YT-336)
 Wampatuck (YT-337)
 Nesutan (YT-338)
 YT-339
 YT-340
 Tuscarora (YT-341)
 YT-342
 Swatane (YT-344)
 YT-345
 YT-346
 Oratamin (YT-347)
 YT-348
 Neomonni (YT-349)
 YT-351 through YT-353
 Corbitant (YT-354)
 YT-355 through YT-358
 Pawtucket (YT-359)
 YT-360 through YT-363
 Sassaba (YT-364)
 Segwarusa (YT-365)
 Waubansee (YT-366)
 Wawasee (YT-367)
 Shahaka YT-368, sunk after collision with ABSD-2 during transit from California to Pearl Harbor, Hawaii, 9 May 1944
 Shamokin (YT-369)
 Skandawati (YT-370)
 Smohalla (YT-371)
 Tatarrax (YT-372)
 Topenebee (YT-373)
 Vaga (YT-374)
 Oconostota (YT-375)
 Winnetka (YT-376)
 Candoto (YT-377)
 Chicomico (YT-378)
 Canuck (YT-379)
 Chanagi (YT-380)
 Chepanoc (YT-381)
 Coatopa (YT-382)
 Cochali (YT-383)
 Waneta (YT-384)
 Wannalancet (YT-385)
 Washakie (YT-386)
 Watseka (YT-387)
 Connewango (YT-388)
 Conohasset (YT-389)
 Ganadoga (YT-390)
 Itara (YT-391)
 Mecosta (YT-392)
 Nakarna (YT-393)
 Winamac (YT-394)
 Wingina (YT-395)
 Wovoka (YT-396)
 Yanegua (YT-397)
 Netakhi (YT-398)
 Numa (YT-399)
 Otokomi (YT-400)
 Owachomo (YT-401)
 Panameta (YT-402)
 Pitamakan (YT-403)
 Coshecton (YT-404)
 Cusseta (YT-405)
 Kittaton (YT-406)
 Lonoto (YT-407)
 Minniska (YT-408)
 Anamosa (YT-409)
 Allamakee (YT-410)
 Ponkabia (YT-411)
 Conchardee (YT-412)
 Portobago (YT-413)
 Satago (YT-414)
 Secota (YT-415)
 Sonnicant (YT-416)
 Taconnet (YT-417)
 Tensaw (YT-418)
 Topawa (YT-419)
 Wallacut (YT-420)
 Windigo (YT-421)
 YT-422
 YT-427
 YT-428
 YT-431
 YT-432
 YT-434 through YT-436
 YT-438
 YT-440 through YT-445
 YT-448
 YT-451
 YT-452
 YT-454 through YT-457
 Resolute (YT-458)/Evea (YT-458)
 Edenshaw (YT-459)
 Kiasutha (YT-463)
 Shabonee (YT-465)
 Chipola (YT-466)
 YT-482
 YT-718

Natick-class

 , ex-YTB-779 [A]
 , ex-YTB-826 [A]

Valiant-class

  [A]
  [A]
  [A]
  [A]
  [A]
  [A]

Rainier-class

 Rainier (YT-808) [A]
 Agamenticus (YT-809) [A]
 Deception (YT-810) [A]
 Olympus (YT-811) [A]
 Baker (YT-812) [A]
 Sentinel (YT-813) [A]

Large Harbor Tugs (YTB) 

 Navigator (YTB-39)
 Penobscot (YTB-42)
 Wando (YTB-123)
 Osceola (YTB-129)
 Cahokia (YTB-135)
 Tamaroa (YTB-136), ex-AT-62, YT-136, sunk in collision 27 January 1946
 Woban (YTB-138)
 Ala (YTB-139)
 Wahtah (YTB-140)
 Heekon (YTB-141)
 Nokomis (YTB-142)
 Montezuma (YTB-145)
 Hoga (YTB-146)
 Tazhia (YTB-147)
 Wenonah (YTB-148)
 Toka (YTB-149)
 Woyot (YTB-150)
 Konoka (YTB-151)
 Yaquima (YTB-171)
 Manistee (YTB-173)
 Allaquippa (YTB-174)
 Chekilli (YTB-175)
 Junaluska (YTB-176)
 Black Fox (YTB-177)
 Dekaury (YTB-178)
 Lone Wolf (YTB-179)
 Madokawando (YTB-180)
 Mazapeta (YTB-181)
 Mawkaw (YTB-182)
 Negwagon (YTB-188)
 Nepanet (YTB-189)
 Orono (YTB-190)
 Osamekin (YTB-191)
 Pessacus (YTB-192)
 Sassacus (YTB-193)
 Squanto (YTB-194)
 Yonaguska (YTB-195)
 Cahto (YTB-215)
 Cochise (YTB-216)
 Ensenore (YTB-217)
 Achigan (YTB-218)
 Hatak (YTB-219)
 Iona (YTB-220)
 Kabout (YTB-221)
 Kasota (YTB-222)
 Mahackemo (YTB-223)
 Manada (YTB-224)
 Maquinna (YTB-225)
 Chaska (YTB-226)
 Alamingo (YTB-227)
 Alamuchee (YTB-228)
 Alarka (YTB-229)
 Bomazeen (YTB-238)
 Uncas (YTB-242)
 Tavibo (YTB-246)
 Dekanisora (YTB-252)
 Anacot (YTB-253)
 Menatonon (YTB-254)
 Kennesaw (YTB-255)
 Menoquet (YTB-256)
 Minooka (YTB-257)
 Moanahonga (YTB-258)
 Arivaca (YTB-259)
 Nasomee (YTB-260)
 Nawona (YTB-261)
 Oneyana (YTB-262)
 Neoga (YTB-263)
 Awatobi (YTB-264)
 Hiawatha (YTB-265)
 Pocahontas (YTB-266)
 Pogatacut (YTB-267)
 Red Cloud (YTB-268)
 Sakarissa (YTB-269)
 Satanta (YTB-270)
 Minnehaha (YTB-271)
 Iwana (YTB-272)
 Tecumseh (YTB-273)
 Pokagon (YTB-274)
 Epanow (YTB-275)
 Tavibo (YTB-276)
 Onockatin (YTB-277)
 Ossahinta (YTB-278)
 Penacook (YTB-279)
 Tuscola (YTB-280)
 Peshawah (YTB-281)
 Piomingo (YTB-282)
 Pitchlynn (YTB-283)
 Neokautah (YTB-284)
 Poquim (YTB-285)
 Quinnapin (YTB-286)
 Sabeata (YTB-287)
 Saguanash (YTB-288)
 Sakaweston (YTB-289)
 Canocan (YTB-290)
 Mamo (YTB-325)
 Haiglar (YTB-327)
 Mauvila (YTB-328)
 Namequa (YTB-331)
 YTB-332
 Dekanawida (YTB-334)
 Dohasan (YTB-335)
 Wampatuck (YTB-337)
 Nesutan (YTB-338)
 Tuscarora (YTB-341)
 Swatane (YTB-344)
 Oratamin (YTB-347)
 Pawtucket (YTB-359)
 Sassaba (YTB-364)
 Segwarusa (YTB-365)
 Waubansee (YTB-366)
 Wawasee (YTB-367)
 Shahaka (YTB-368)
 Shamokin (YTB-369)
 Skandawati (YTB-370)
 Smohalla (YTB-371)
 Tatarrax (YTB-372)
 Topenebee (YTB-373)
 Vaga (YTB-374)
 Oconostota (YTB-375)
 Winnetka (YTB-376)
 Candoto (YTB-377)
 Chicomico (YTB-378)
 Canuck (YTB-379)
 Chanagi (YTB-380)
 Chepanoc (YTB-381)
 Coatopa (YTB-382)
 Cochali (YTB-383)
 Waneta (YTB-384)
 Wannalancet (YTB-385)
 Washakie (YTB-386)
 Watseka (YTB-387)
 Connewango (YTB-388)
 Conohasset (YTB-389)
 Ganadoga (YTB-390)
 Itara (YTB-391)
 Mecosta (YTB-392)
 Nakarna (YTB-393)
 Winimac (YTB-394)
 Wingina (YTB-395)
 Wovoka (YTB-396)
 Yanegua (YTB-397)
 Natahki (YTB-398)
 Numa (YTB-399)
 Otokomi (YTB-400)
 Owachomo (YTB-401)
 Panameta (YTB-402)
 Pitamakan (YTB-403)
 Coshecton (YTB-404)
 Cusseta (YTB-405)
 Kittaton (YTB-406)
 Lonoto (YTB-407)
 Minniska (YTB-408)
 Anamosa (YTB-409)
 Allamakee (YTB-410)
 Ponkabia (YTB-411)
 Conchardee (YTB-412)
 Portobago (YTB-413)
 Satago (YTB-414)
 Secota (YTB-415)
 Sonnicant (YTB-416)
 Taconnet (YTB-417)
 Tensaw (YTB-418)
 Topawa (YTB-419)
 Wallacut (YTB-420)
 Windigo (YTB-421)
 Evea (YTB-458)
 Edenshaw (YTB-459)
 Kiasutha (YTB-463)
 Shabonee (YTB-465)
 Chipola (YTB-466)
 YTB-492
 Abinago (YTB-493)
 Alnaba (YTB-494)
 Barboncito (YTB-495)
 Chahao (YTB-496)
 Tlingit (YTB-497)
 Cholocco (YTB-498)
 Chiquito (YTB-499)
 Chohonaga (YTB-500)
 Ankachak (YTB-501)
 Apohola (YTB-502)
 Atanus (YTB-503)
 Ayanabi (YTB-504)
 Bocachee (YTB-505)
 Hombro (YTB-506)
 Mimac (YTB-507)
 Nootka (YTB-508)
 Makah (YTB-509)
 Chilkat (YTB-510)
 Carascan (YTB-511)
 Hastwiana (YTB-512)
 Hiamonee (YTB-513)
 Lelaka (YTB-514)
 Oswegatchie (YTB-515)
 Pocasset (YTB-516)
 Pokanoket (YTB-517)
 Hisada (YTB-518)
 Mahoa (YTB-519)
 Nacheninga (YTB-520)
 Nabigwon (YTB-521)
 Sagawamick (YTB-522)
 Senasqua (YTB-523)
 Tutahaco (YTB-524)
 Wabanquot (YTB-525)
 Wahaka (YTB-526)
 
 Wakonda (YTB-528)
 Wickawee (YTB-529)
 Aranca (YTB-530)
 Yapashi (YTB-531)
 Ocmulgee (YTB-532)
 Shahaska (YTB-533)
 Nadli (YTB-534)
 Nahasho (YTB-535)
 Nahoke (YTB-536)
 Nanigo (YTB-537)
 Nashel (YTB-538)
 Sikis (YTB-539)
 Quileute (YTB-540)
 Ozette (YTB-541)
 Chegodega (YTB-542)
 Etawina (YTB-543)
 Yatanocas (YTB-544)
 Accohanoc (YTB-545)
 Takos (YTB-546)
 Yanaba (YTB-547)
 Matunak (YTB-548)
 Migadan (YTB-549)
 Acoma (YTB-701)
 Arawak (YTB-702)
 Canarsee (YTB-703)
 Moratoc (YTB-704)
 Pequawet (YTB-705)
 Waliaki (YTB-706)
 Sanpoil (YTB-707)
 Setauket (YTB-708)
 Tocobaga (YTB-709)
 Tonkawa (YTB-710)
 Wabaquasset (YTB-724)
 YTB-725
 Oneka (YTB-729)
 Mahaska (YTB-730)
 Cockenoe (YTB-736)
 Wapasha (YTB-737), ex-YNT-13
 Namontack (YTB-738), ex-YNT-14
 Picqua (YTB-739)
 Metacom (YTB-740)
 Pokagon (YTB-746)
 Edenshaw (YTB-752)
 Marin (YTB-753)
 YTB-754
 YTB-755
 Pontiac (YTB-756)
 Oshkosh (YTB-757)
 Paducah (YTB-758)
 Bogalusa (YTB-759)

Natick-class

 
 
 
 
 
 
 
 
 
 
 
  [A]
 
 
 
 
 
 
 
  [A], later YT-800
 
 
 
 
 
 
 
 
 
 
 
 
 
 
 
 
 
 
 
 
 
 
 
 
 
 
 
 
 
 
 
 
 
 
 
 
 
 
 
 
  [A]
 
 
  [A]
  [A]
 
  [A], later YT-801
 
 
 
 
  [A]
 
 
 
  [A]
  [A]

 YTB-837 through YTB-844

Small Harbor Tugs (YTL) 

 YTL-16 through YTL-18
 YTL-86 through YTL-96
 YTL-98 
 YTL-99
 YTL-117
 YTL-118
 YTL-130
 YTL-132
 YTL-143
 YTL-144
 YTL-152 through YTL-169
 YTL-184 through YTL-186
 YTL-196
 YTL-197
 YTL-199 through YTL-212
 YTL-230 through YTL-237
 YTL-244 through YTL-251
 YTL-291 through YTL-320
 YTL-324
 YTL-333
 YTL-339
 YTL-340
 YTL-345
 YTL-346
 YTL-348
 YTL-351 through YTL-353
 YTL-355 through YTL-358
 YTL-360 through YTL-363
 YTL-422 through YTL-457
 YTL-473
 YTL-479 through YTL-490
 YTL-550
 YTL-553
 YTL-557 through YTL-560
 YTL-566
 YTL-567
 YTL-571
 YTL-583
 YTL-586
 YTL-588
 YTL-590 through YTL-592
 YTL-594
 YTL-600 through YTL-602
 YTL-614
 YTL-618
 YTL-710
 YTL-711
 YTL-718
 Okisko (YTL-735), ex-YNT-10
 YTL-761

Medium Harbor Tugs (YTM) 

 Iwana (YTM-2)
 Unadilla (YTM-4)
 Samoset (YTM-5)
 Penacook (YTM-6)
 Pawtucket (YTM-7)
 Sotoyomo (YTM-9)
 YTM-13
 YTM-14
 Tecumseh (YTM-24)
 Catawba (YTM-32)
 Choptank (YTM-36)
 Active (YTM-112)
 Reindeer (YTM-115)
 Geronimo (YTM-119)
 Stallion (YTM-120)
 Tillamook (YTM-122)
 Challenge (YTM-126), ex-SP-1015, ex-AT-59, ex-YT-126
 Powhatan (YTM-128)
 Osceola (YTM-129)
 Massasoit (YTM-131)
 Narkeeta (YTM-133)
 Wahneta (YTM-134)
 Cahokia (YTM-135)
 Tamaroa (YTM-136)
 Woban (YTM-138)
 Ala (YTM-139), grounded and sank, Kuluk Bay, Adak, Alaska, 19 May 1964
 Wahtah (YTM-140)
 Heekon (YTM-141)
 Nokomis (YTM-142)
 Montezuma (YTM-145)
 Hoga (YTM-146)
 Tazhia (YTM-147)
 Wenonah (YTM-148)
 Toka (YTM-149)
 Woyot (YTM-150)
 Konoka (YTM-151)
 Alloway (YTM-170)
 Allaquippa (YTM-174)
 Chekilli (YTM-175)
 Junaluska (YTM-176)
 Black Fox (YTM-177)
 Dekaury (YTM-178)
 Madokawando (YTM-180)
 Mazapeta (YTM-181)
 Mawkaw (YTM-182)
 Canonicus (YTM-187)
 Negwagon (YTM-188)
 Nepanet (YTM-189)
 Orono (YTM-190)
 Sassacus (YTM-193)
 Yonaguska (YTM-195)
 YTM-213
 Alamingo (YTM-227)
 YTM-239
 YTM-240
 YTM-243
 Dekanisora (YTM-252)
 Menoquet (YTM-256)
 Arivaca (YTM-259)
 Oneyana (YTM-262)
 Neoga (YTM-263)
 Hiawatha (YTM-265)
 Red Cloud (YTM-268)
 Sakarissa (YTM-269)
 Satanta (YTM-270)
 Minnehaha (YTM-271)
 Iwana (YTM-272)
 Olathe (YTM-273)
 YTM-321
 YTM-322
 Lively (YTM-323)
 Mamo (YTM-325)
 Sacagawea (YTM-326)
 Mauvila (YTM-328)
 YTM-330
 Dohasan (YTM-335)
 Skenandoa (YTM-336)
 YTM-342
 Oratamin (YTM-347)
 Neomonni (YTM-349)
 Corbitant (YTM-354)
 Pawtucket (YTM-359)
 Sassaba (YTM-364)
 Segwarusa (YTM-365)
 Waubansee (YTM-366)
 Wawasee (YTM-367)
 Shahaka (YTM-368)
 Shamokin (YTM-369)
 Skandawati (YTM-370)
 Smohalla (YTM-371)
 Tatarrax (YTM-372)
 Topenebee (YTM-373)
 Vaga (YTM-374)
 Oconostota (YTM-375)
 Candoto (YTM-377)
 Chicomico (YTM-378)
 Chanagi (YTM-380)
 Chepanoc (YTM-381)
 Coatopa (YTM-382)
 Cochali (YTM-383)
 Waneta (YTM-384)
 Wannalancet (YTM-385)
 Washakie (YTM-386)
 Watseka (YTM-387)
 Connewango (YTM-388)
 Ganadoga (YTM-390)
 Itara (YTM-391)
 Mecosta (YTM-392)
 Nakarna (YTM-393)
 Winamac (YTM-394)
 Wingina (YTM-395)
 Wovoka (YTM-396)
 Yanegua (YTM-397)
 Natahki (YTM-398)
 Numa (YTM-399)
 Otokomi (YTM-400)
 Owachomo (YTM-401)
 Panameta (YTM-402)
 Pitamakan (YTM-403)
 Coshecton (YTM-404)
 Cusseta (YTM-405)
 Kittaton (YTM-406)
 Lonoto (YTM-407)
 Minniska (YTM-408)
 Anamosa (YTM-409)
 Allamakee (YTB-410)
 Conchardee (YTM-412)
 Porobago (YTM-413)
 Satago (YTM-414)
 Secota (YTM-415)
 Taconnet (YTM-417)
 Tensaw (YTM-418)
 Topawa (YTM-419)
 Wallacut (YTM-420)
 Windigo (YTM-421)
 YTM-460 through YTM-462
 Cholocco (YTM-464)
 Chipola (YTM-466)
 YTM-467, lost in the Marshall or Gilbert Islands, March 1944
 YTM-468 through YTM-472
 YTM-474 through YTM-478
 Abinago (YTM-493)
 Alnaba (YTM-494)
 Barboncito (YTM-495)
 Chahao (YTM-496)
 Tlingit (YTM-497)
 Manteo (YTM-517)
 Hisada (YTM-518)
 Mahoa (YTM-519)
 Nacheninga (YTM-520)
 Nabigwon (YTM-521)
 Sagawamick (YTM-522)
 Senasqua (YTM-523)
 Tutahaco (YTM-524)
 Wabanaquot (YTM-525)
 Wahaka (YTM-526)
 
 Ocmulgee (YTM-532)
 Shahaska (YTM-533)
 Nadli (YTM-534)
 Nahasho (YTM-535)
 Nahoke (YTM-536)
 Nanigo (YTM-537)
 Sikis (YTM-539)
 Quileute (YTM-540)
 Ozette (YTM-541)
 Chegodega (YTM-542)
 Etawina (YTM-543)
 Yatanocas (YTM-544)
 Accohanoc (YTM-545)
 Takos (YTM-546)
 Yanaba (YTM-547)
 Matunak (YTM-548)
 Migadan (YTM-549)
 YTM-606
 YTM-607
 Acoma (YTM-701)
 Arawak (YTM-702)
 Canarsee (YTM-703)
 Moratoc (YTM-704)
 YTM-721
 YTM-722
 Hopocan (YTM-728)
 Oneka (YTM-729)
 Keshena (YTM-731)
 Canasatego (YTM-732)
 Donacona (YTM-733)
 Mankato (YTM-734)
 Tahchee (YTM-736)
 Annawan (YTM-739)
 Metacom (YTM-740)
 Tamaque (YTM-741)
 Adario (YTM-743)
 Chicopee (YTM-747)
 
 Kaukauna (YTM-749)
 Hackensack (YTM-750)
 Manteo (YTM-751)
 Kewaunee (YTM-752)
 Naugatuck (YTM-753)
 Woonsocket (YTM-754)
 Waukegan (YTM-755)
 Owatonna (YTM-756)
 
 YTM-758
 Mizar (YTM-759)
 Mascoutah (YTM-760)
 Menasha (YTM-761)
 Pokanoket (YTM-762)
 Muskegon (YTM-763)
 Cholocco (YTM-764)
 Chiquito (YTM-765)
 Chohonaga (YTM-766)
 Ankachak (YTM-767)
 Apohola (YTM-768)
 Hombro (YTM-769)
 Mimac (YTM-770)
 Nootka (YTM-771)
 Makah (YTM-772)
 Chilkat (YTM-773)
 Carascan (YTM-774)
 Hastwiana (YTM-775)
 Hiamonee (YTM-776)
 Lelaka (YTM-777)
 Oswegatchie (YTM-778)
 Pocasset (YTM-779)
 Pokanoket (YTM-780)
 YTM-800 through YTM-804

Torpedo Trials Craft (YTT) 

 YTT-3, later YR-42

Cape Flattery-class

 Cape Flattery (YTT-9)
 Battle Point (YTT-10) [A]
 Discovery Bay (YTT-11) [A]
 Agate Pass (YTT-12)

Drone Aircraft Catapult Control Craft (YV) 
 Catapult (YV-1), ex-LSM-445
 Launcher (YV-2), ex-LSM-446
 Targeteer (YV-3), ex-LSM(R)-508, nicknamed the "world's smallest aircraft carrier"

Catapult Barges (YVC)

Water Barges (YW, YWN) 
YW barges are self-propelled, YWN barges are not.

 YW-2, later YO-10, YR-19
 YW-50 - captured 10 December 1941 at Guam
 YW-54 - captured 10 December 1941 at Guam
 YW-55 - captured 10 December 1941 at Guam
 YW-56, ex-DD-259, later IX-98
 YW-58 - captured 10 December 1941 at Guam
 YW-87, later Monob One (IX-309)
 YW-97, ex-SC-64
 YW-114, sank when cargo shifted at Tongass Narrows near Ketchikan, Alaska on 12 August 1989
 YW-120, ex-PC-624
 YW-145, later YWN-145
 YW-146, later YWN-146
 YWN-148, ex-YON-187
 YWN-154, later YOGN-125
 YWN-156, ex-YOGN-116
 YWN-157, ex-YOG-32

Gallery

See also 
 List of current ships of the United States Navy
 
 List of unclassified miscellaneous vessels of the United States Navy
 Glossary of watercraft types in service of the United States
 Coaling (ships)
 United States Navy torpedo retrievers

Similar United States Maritime Administration (MARAD) designations:
 Type B ship
 Type V ship

References

External links 

Museum ship
 USS Hoga (YT-146) - Arkansas Inland Maritime Museum, North Little Rock, AR

Yard and district craft
Yard and district craft list